This is a list of Belarusian painters.

 Meer Akselrod
 Peter Blume
 Vitold Byalynitsky-Birulya
 Marc Chagall
 Jonas Damelis
 Mai Dantsig
 Elena Drobychevskaja
 Anatoli Lvovich Kaplan
 Michel Kikoine
 Irina Kotova
 Pinchus Kremegne
 Dmitry Kustanovich
 Yehuda Pen
 Alexandr Rodin
 Alfred Isidore Romer
 Mikhail Savicki
 William S. Schwartz
 Yauhen Shatokhin
 Nikodim Silivanovich
 Joseph Solman
 Chaïm Soutine
 Sergey Zaryanko

Painters
Belarus